Burgess Glacier is a glacier,  long, flowing northwest through Otway Massif to enter Mill Stream Glacier. It was named by the Advisory Committee on Antarctic Names for Robert W. Burgess, a United States Antarctic Research Program ionospheric physicist at South Pole Station, 1963.

References 

Glaciers of Borchgrevink Coast